Frank or Francis Sargent may refer to:
 Frank P. Sargent (1851–1908), American trade union functionary and government official
 Frank Sargent Hoffman (1852–1928), American philosopher
 Frank Sargent (sports executive) (1902–1988), Canadian ice hockey and curling executive
 Francis Sargent (1915–1998), American politician and governor of Massachusetts
 Frank Sargent (scientist), British microbial physiologist

See also
 Frank Sargeant (author), author of books on the outdoors
 Frank Sargeant (bishop) (born 1932), Anglican bishop